Rubroshiraia is a monotypic genus of the family Shiraiaceae. Its only species, Rubroshiraia bambusae, is a bamboo-dwelling fungus native to China. It and its genus Rubroshiraia were first formally named in 2019. It grows in western China, native to Yunnan on bamboos on which it form a fruit-like pink ball. It was known as zhuhongjun which was traditionally used to treat arthritis as well as infantile convulsions.

References

Pleosporales
Dothideomycetes genera